For information on all Campbell University sports, see Campbell Fighting Camels and Lady Camels

The Campbell Fighting Camels football program is the intercollegiate American football team for Campbell University located in the U.S. state of North Carolina. The team competes in the NCAA Division I Football Championship Subdivision (FCS) and are members of the Colonial Athletic Association (CAA). Campbell's first football team was fielded in 2008. The team plays its home games at the 5,000 seat Barker–Lane Stadium in Buies Creek, North Carolina. Mike Minter, former safety for the National Football League's Carolina Panthers, is the head coach.

The Fighting Camels, which did not award scholarships in football (though awarding them in other sports), transitioned to scholarship football and joined most of the school's other sports in the Big South Conference in 2018. In 2023 the team transitioned into the CAA.

History

Campbell University once had a football team, years ago, but it was disbanded and Campbell discontinued football for 58 years. That football program lasted for 25 years between 1925 and 1950, and was canceled at the onset of the Korean War.

Classifications
2008–present: NCAA Division I–AA/FCS

Conference memberships
1925–1950: Independent
1951–2007: No team
2008–2017: Pioneer Football League
2018–2022: Big South Conference
2023–present: Colonial Athletic Association

Current coaching staff

Notable former players
Notable alumni include:
Brian Hudson

Year-by-year results

Statistics correct as of the end of the 2018-19 college football season

References

External links
 

 
American football teams established in 1925
1925 establishments in North Carolina